The Shark Hole Point Formation is a geologic formation in Bocas del Toro Province of northwestern Panama. The siltstones preserve fossils dating back to the Pliocene period.

Fossil content 
 Diaphus depressifrons, D. paxtoni

See also 
 List of fossiliferous stratigraphic units in Panama

References

Bibliography 
 

Geologic formations of Panama
Neogene Panama
Paleontology in Panama
Siltstone formations
Open marine deposits
Formations